Jenna Silvonen (born 2 January 1999) is a Finnish ice hockey goaltender and member of the Finnish national team, currently playing in the Naisten Liiga with Kiekko-Espoo Naiset. Her college ice hockey career was played with the Mercyhurst Lakers women's ice hockey program in the College Hockey America (CHA) conference of the NCAA Division I during 2019 to 2022.

She represented Finland at the IIHF Women's World Championship tournaments in 2019, 2021, and 2022.

References

External links

1999 births
Living people
Espoo Blues Naiset players
Finnish expatriate ice hockey players in the United States
Finnish women's ice hockey goaltenders
Kiekko-Espoo Naiset players
LoKV Naiset players
Mercyhurst Lakers women's ice hockey players
People from Lohja
Sportspeople from Uusimaa